Steve Gore is an English magician from Bradford, West Yorkshire. He is probably best known for creating; "Trick Photography, Visions from Vegas, The Casino Con & most recently the GPS Deck, Amnesia Deck and Together Forever." Trick photography was stated as "Close up trick of the year" in 2010 by MagicWeek.

He is a Past President of the Northern Magic Circle and the Bradford Magic Circle, and a member of the International Brotherhood of Magicians (British Ring). He has been interested in magic most of his life but joined the Bradford Magic Circle in 1992. He also lectures his own created magic effects for magic clubs and conventions. He has lectured for over thirty magic clubs throughout the country including The Magic Circle, The British Magical Society, Blackpool Magicians Club, Modern Mystic League, and the 2012 IBM British Ring 'Best of British' Convention. He also lectured for the members of the Magic Castle in Hollywood in 2014. 

Gore has performed a stage magic act with his eldest daughter Deanna, who is currently 14 years old. Together they are Make Believe Magic, and have appeared at several magic gala shows including the Bradford Magic Circle's Hey Presto show in March 2011, the Northern Magic Circle's Best of British Gala show in Scarborough in April 2012 and appeared at the IBM British Ring Presidential Dinner Cabaret in 2013. Steve produced a stage act Genetics, formed in March 2018 and features Steve, his wife Victoria and their two daughters Deanna and Jenna (aged 14 and 11).  It is set in a house environment and has the whole family performing magic with everyday household appliances.

Gore has appeared at the Magic Castle in Hollywood, LA, performing in the Parlour of Prestadigitation for 21 shows in June 2014.

Filmography 
 Trick Photography (RSVP Magic)

References

 Magician Steve aims to pull title out of hat (From Bradford Telegraph and Argus)
 Review Lecture – Steve Gore 2010
 (Genetics From Bradford Telegraph and Argus)

External links 

 
 Makebelievemagic.co.uk
 Genetics website
 Northern Magic Convention 2013
 British Ring 2011 Convention Acts

Living people
English magicians
Year of birth missing (living people)